Susanna Haliburton Weldon (1817–1899) was a Canadian artist and ceramics collector.

The daughter of Thomas Chandler Haliburton, she married John Wesley Weldon in 1848. She amassed a significant collection of English and Chinese ceramics; this collection is "probably the oldest formed in Canada" and is now owned by the University of King's College in Nova Scotia. A scholarship at the university is named in her honour.

References

1817 births
1899 deaths
19th-century Canadian women artists
Artists from Nova Scotia